Zhou Chuchu (born November 15, 1986) is a Chinese film and television actress.

Biography
Zhou was born in 1986 in Chengdu, Sichuan Province. She also has a younger sister. At a young age, she went to Beijing to become a singer, but quit eventually. She made her film debut in Ocean Flame in 2008.
She also starred in the biopic Ip Man: The Final Fight in 2013 alongside Hong Kong actor Anthony Wong.

Filmography

Film

Awards
 Second Macau International Film Festival: Best Newcomer Actor Award for The Wild Strawberries 野草莓 (2010)

References

External links
Official Blog on Sina 
Zhou Chuchu on Sina Weibo 
Zhou Chuchu on Chinese Media 360

1986 births
Actresses from Chengdu
Living people
21st-century Chinese actresses
Chinese film actresses
Chinese television actresses